Martians Go Home is a 1990 comedy film starring Randy Quaid. It was directed by David Odell and written by Charles S. Haas based on the 1954 novel of the same name by science-fiction author Fredric Brown.

Synopsis
After years of pursuing a jazz career that never quite took shape, Mark Deveraux took several jobs writing TV Show themes and commercial jingles to earn a living; while very successful in acquiring steady work, he longs to write meaningful music. After winning out over several more experienced composers to score a sci-fi film, he spends a weekend in a cabin trying to develop a song that sounds like a 'universal greeting' based on the producer's instruction. Finally composing something that he believes is worthwhile, he calls his girlfriend, who is the producer for an internationally syndicated talk radio show, who accidentally broadcasts the song.

The following day, while recovering from a hangover, Devereaux is visited by a Martian who claims that they heard the greeting and have come to Earth to establish lasting peace and prosperity on the planet—only to immediately recant and state that he was joking. He claims that "Mars is a dump" and that the billions of bored Martians have decided to come to Earth and to have fun at humanity's expense. Devereaux tries to shoot him, but discovers that the Martian has the ability to both read minds and teleport, allowing him to predict and dodge any attack. Around the globe, billions of Martians begin to wreak havoc with their abilities, revealing intimate secrets, appearing and disrupting major sporting events, and voyeuristically spying on couples who are having sex (as they cannot reproduce sexually).

Deveraux realizes that they felt 'invited' by his music and interrupts another national broadcast to play the song again—realizing too late that he needs to play it in reverse. Feigning insanity, he is committed to a psychiatric hospital where his girlfriend eventually breaks him free. Trying again, they hijack another international broadcast while Devereaux plays the song backwards. In spite of numerous distractions and ploys by the Martians, he succeeds and the Martians simultaneously disappear from around the globe. Having realized that he has talent, a short time later he quits his jobs for Hollywood and reforms his Jazz quartet to go on the road.

Cast
 Randy Quaid as Mark Devereaux
 Margaret Colin as Sara Brody
 Anita Morris as Dr. Jane Buchanan
 John Philbin as Donny
 Ronny Cox as the President
 Timothy Stack as Seagrams
 Bruce French as Elgins
 Gerrit Graham as Stan Garrett
 Dean Devlin as Joe Fledermaus
 Roy Brocksmith as Mr. Kornheiser
 Nicky Katt as Hippie
 Troy Evans as Cop
 Steve Blacknell as Game Show Host
 Allan Katz as Melvin Knudson
 Cynthia Ettinger as Dr. Jane's Patient
 Brent Hinkley as Dr. Jane's Patient

See also
 List of films featuring extraterrestrials
 Mars in fiction

References

External links

1990 films
1990s science fiction comedy films
Alien visitations in films
American science fiction comedy films
1990 comedy films
1990s English-language films
Films directed by David Odell
Films based on American novels
Films based on science fiction novels
Films about composers
1990s American films